Myocalandra exarata, is a species of weevil found in India, Sri Lanka, Malay Peninsula, Philippines, New Caledonia, Madagascar, Seychelles, Mauritius and Marianas Islands.

Biology
It is a black colored beetle. Both adult and larvae are about 15 mm in length. Primarily a borer of Bambusa vulgaris, it is also observed from stored reed, Ochlandra travancorica.

References 

Curculionidae
Insects of Sri Lanka
Beetles described in 1838